Patoka Township is located in Marion County, Illinois. As of the 2010 census, its population was 1,038 and it contained 523 housing units.

Geography 
Patoka Township (T4N R1E) is centered at 38°47'N 89°5'W (38.780, -89.086). It is traversed north–south by U.S. Route 51 and east–west by the North Fork of the Kaskaskia River. The city of Patoka is located near the south end of the township.

Demographics

Adjacent townships 
 Kaskaskia Township, Fayette County (north)
 Wilberton Township, Fayette County (northeast)
 Foster Township (east)
 Tonti Township (southeast)
 Carrigan Township (south)
 East Fork Township, Clinton County (southwest)
 Pope Township, Fayette County (west)
 Pope Township, Fayette County (northwest)

References

External links
US Census
City-data.com
Illinois State Archives

Townships in Marion County, Illinois
Townships in Illinois